Inna Șupac (born 9 February 1984) is a Russophone Moldovan politician who served as a member of the Moldovan Parliament in the 20th legislature (2014-2018), representing the Party of Communists of the Republic of Moldova. She was also a deputy in 3 previous legislatures: April–July 2009, July 2009 – 2010 and 2010–2014.

In the parliamentary elections of November 30, 2014, Șupac ranked 23rd in the PCRM list and initially failed to enter parliament, but won her seat on May 11, 2015, after deputy Irina Vlah was elected as mayor of Gagauzia and due to the incompatibility of positions she submitted her mandate as deputy.

Șupac has been a member of the Communist Party since 2005, and since 2008 has been a member of the PCRM Central Committee. Between 2007 and 2011, she was the first secretary of the Communist Youth Union of Moldova.

She promoted in the Republic of Moldova the action "Георгиевская ленточка" (Ribbon of Saint George) urging the population to the ribbon attached to their chest.

Șupac has a degree in international relations from the Free International University of Moldova (2001–2006). From October 2006 to October 2007, she studied at the European Institute of Political Science in Moldova, and between October 2007 and September 2008 she did a master's degree in anthropology at the Higher Anthropological School of Moldova.

According to her CV, she speaks Romanian, Russian, Ukrainian and English.

References

1984 births
Living people
People from Basarabeasca District
Moldovan MPs 2009
Moldovan MPs 2009–2010
Moldovan MPs 2010–2014
Moldovan MPs 2014–2018
Party of Communists of the Republic of Moldova politicians
Moldovan female MPs
21st-century Moldovan women politicians